Sara Casasola (born 29 November 1999) is an Italian professional racing cyclist, who is a cyclo-cross and a road cyclist. In 2022 she rode for Born to Win G20 Ambedo. From 2018 to 2021 she rode for the UCI Women's Continental Team .

References

External links

1999 births
Living people
Italian female cyclists
Place of birth missing (living people)